Bentonyx (meaning "Bentons' claw") is an extinct genus of rhynchosaur from the middle Triassic epoch of Devon in England. Its fossil, a well preserved skull, BRSUG 27200, was discovered in Otter Sandstone Formation (late Anisian age) and was first assigned to Rhynchosaurus spenceri, that is known from 25 specimens. This species was reassigned to its own genus, Fodonyx, that was first described by David W. E. Hone and Michael Benton in 2008. More recently, this skull was reassigned to this genus by Max C. Langer, Felipe C. Montefeltro, David E. Hone, Robin Whatley and Cesar L. Schultz in 2010 and the type species is Bentonyx sidensis.

The Cladogram below is based on work by Martin Ezcurra et al.

References

Rhynchosaurs
Middle Triassic reptiles of Europe
Fossil taxa described in 2010
Anisian life
Prehistoric reptile genera